The Herbert N. Straus House is a large town house at 9 East 71st Street, just east of Fifth Avenue, on the Upper East Side of Manhattan in New York City. The exterior was designed by Horace Trumbauer, and completed in 1932. A roof extension was added in 1977. A  oak door and large arched windows are distinctive features of the limestone exterior. A heated sidewalk is located in front of the house. 

Vicky Ward in 2003 described the house as "the crown jewel of the city's residential town houses...it sits on—or, rather, commands—the block of 71st Street between Fifth and Madison Avenues. Almost ludicrously out of proportion with its four- and five-story neighbors, it seems more like an institution than a house" and that it was believed to be the largest private residence in Manhattan. The house's 2008 property tax bill was the fourth highest for a single residence in New York City. In 2019 it was valued at $77 million by the United States Attorney for the Southern District of New York and at $56 million by the New York City Department of Finance.

History
Herbert Straus, the sixth of seven children born to Isidor and Ida Straus (co-owners of retailers R. H. Macy & Co.), never lived in the house, and work on the house was canceled shortly before Straus's death in 1933. Straus's heirs never completed work on the house due to the high cost of property taxes.  It was unfinished in 1944 when it was donated by the sons of Herbert Straus to the Roman Catholic Archdiocese of New York for a hospital. 

The Birch Wathen School occupied the house from 1962 until 1989, when it was purchased for $13.2 million by the billionaire businessman Leslie Wexner. It was featured in the December 1995 edition of Architectural Digest. The interior of the house was designed under Wexner by John Stefanidis and remodelled by the architect Thierry Despont.

Jeffrey Epstein
Jeffrey Epstein moved into the house in 1996, at which time he claimed to own it, although its registered ownership changed in 2011 from a trust connected to both Wexner and Epstein to a trust controlled by Epstein.

Vicky Ward visited Epstein at the house for "The Talented Mr Epstein", her 2003 profile in Vanity Fair magazine. Ward wrote that she felt that upon entering the house "you feel you have stumbled into someone’s private Xanadu. This is no mere rich person's home, but a high-walled, eclectic, imperious fantasy that seems to have no boundaries". Rows of 'individually framed eyeballs' manufactured for injured English soldiers decorated the entrance hall along with a 'twice-life-size sculpture of a naked African warrior'. A room described as a "leather room" had leopard print chairs with walls decorated in 'cordovan-colored fabric'. A large 'Oriental fantasy of a woman holding an opium pipe and caressing a snarling lionskin' hung on the walls.

A large office spanned the width of the house, decorated with a large Persian rug alongside '18th-century black lacquered Portuguese cabinets' and a desk that belonged to the banker J. P. Morgan. A copy of Justine, or The Misfortunes of Virtue by the Marquis de Sade, which tells the tale of the sexually abused 12-year old protagonist of the novel, was on the desk. A Steinway grand piano was surmounted by a stuffed black poodle. Epstein told Ward that "No decorator would ever tell you to do that ... But I want people to think what it means to stuff a dog". The French decorator Alberto Pinto was responsible for much of the interior. The house has a bathroom lined in lead with closed-circuit television.

The New York City Police Department (NYPD) authorities and FBI agents raided the house in July 2019 as part of a federal investigation into sex trafficking allegations against Epstein.

2021 sale
In March 2021, former Goldman Sachs executive Michael Daffey purchased the home for $51 million, with proceeds from the sale going to the Epstein Victims' Compensation Program. Daffey secured a $30.6 million loan from Citigroup to purchase the home.

References

External link

Horace Trumbauer buildings
Houses completed in 1932
Houses in Manhattan
Upper East Side
Jeffrey Epstein
Les Wexner